"Lipstick Traces (on a Cigarette)" is a song first recorded by New Orleans singer Benny Spellman in 1962. It was written by Allen Toussaint under the pseudonym Naomi Neville. The song became Spellman's only hit record, peaking at number 28 on the Billboard R&B chart and number 80 on the Billboard Hot 100 pop chart. The flip side of the single was "Fortune Teller", made famous by The Rolling Stones cover among others.

Toussaint explained the song's origin in an interview with journalist Terry Gross of National Public Radio: "Well, 'Lipstick Traces'...the guy, Benny Spellman, that sang the bass part on "Mother-In-Law" - he didn't know what it was worth at the time we were doing it, but when "Mother-In-Law" came out and sold, and went to number one, let's say, Benny Spellman that sang the bass part made sure that everyone within the sound of his voice got to know that he sang that part. And then he would go around - he would gig - based on [the fact that] he sang the low part on "Mother-In-Law." And he encouraged me...with much force, to write him a song that he could use that concept. And one result of that was the song 'Lipstick Traces.'"

"Lipstick Traces (on a Cigarette)" was recorded in New Orleans on February 2, 1962. The background vocals were done by label mates Irma Thomas and Willie Harper.

Cover versions 

The song has been covered by a number of artists and bands. One of the earliest covers was done by The O'Jays in 1965. (Imperial single 66102) Their version peaked on the R&B chart at #28, matching the R&B chart success of Spellman's original, and surpassing it on the Pop Chart, peaking at #48 Pop. It was included in the album Comin' Through (Imperial 9290), released in the same year. The O'Jays, with their original 5-member lineup of Walter Williams, (who sang lead), Eddie Levert, William Powell, Bobby Massey, and Bill Isles, performed this song on a 1965 telecast of ABC-TV's "Shivaree".

The American Breed covered this song on their 1967 debut album, The American Breed.

Ringo Starr covered it in his 1978 album Bad Boy. Starr's version was released as a single in the US, backed with "Old Time Relovin'", on 17 April 1978. Other artists who covered the song include Snooks Eaglin, Frankie Ford, Delbert McClinton, Amazing Rhythm Aces, Donel Austin and Alex Chilton. Joe Krown did an instrumental version of the song in his album Old Friends, released in 2007.

In Popular Culture 

The song was the basis for the main title of Greil Marcus' book Lipstick Traces: A Secret History of the 20th Century.

References 
 Footnotes

 Citations

Songs about tobacco
1962 singles
Songs written by Allen Toussaint
The O'Jays songs
Ringo Starr songs
Polydor Records singles
1962 songs
Minit Records singles